The U.S. Post Office in Milan, Tennessee, located at 382 S. Main St., was built in 1936.  It was listed on the National Register of Historic Places in 1987.

Design credit is given to Louis A. Simon.  The building was deemed notable as "a fine example of the simplified Classical Revival design popular for government buildings during the 1930s."

References

National Register of Historic Places in Gibson County, Tennessee
Neoclassical architecture in Tennessee
Government buildings completed in 1936